Never Mind 2014 was a professional wrestling event promoted by DDT Pro-Wrestling (DDT). It took place on December 23, 2014, in Tokyo, Japan, at the Korakuen Hall. The event aired domestically on Fighting TV Samurai. It was the fourteenth event in the Never Mind series.

Production

Background
Since 2001, DDT began producing their year-end shows under the branch of "Never Mind". The events' traditional venue was initially the Korakuen Hall, but during the years, the promotion moved the events to other arenas. These events conclude certain feuds and rivalries built during the year. Beginning with 2017 and until 2021, the "Never Mind" series were briefly replaced by the DDT Ultimate Party as the promotion's year-closing events.

Storylines
The event featured ten professional wrestling matches that resulted from scripted storylines, where wrestlers portrayed villains, heroes, or less distinguishable characters in the scripted events that built tension and culminated in a wrestling match or series of matches.

Event
There were a total of three title fights at the event. In the first one, an inflatable doll named Yoshihiko defeated LiLiCo to win the Ironman Heavymetalweight Championship. In the second one, Happy Motel (Konosuke Takeshita and Tetsuya Endo) scored their fourth consecutive defense of the KO-D Tag Team Championship over Shuten Doji (Kudo and Yukio Sakaguchi). In the main event, Harashima successfully defended the KO-D Openweight Championship against Shigehiro Irie.

Results

References

External links
The official DDT Pro-Wrestling website

DDT Pro-Wrestling shows
2014 in professional wrestling
December 2014 events in Japan
Professional wrestling in Tokyo